Aditya Birla Memorial Hospital is a multi-speciality medical centre in Pune, India. The hospital is named for  Aditya Birla. 

Rajashree Birla, chairperson of the Aditya Birla Foundation which is funding the medical centre, is steering this project. It is Maharashtra's First Joint Commission International and National Accreditation Board for Hospital accredited hospital, and also India's first HACCP and ISO: 22000:2005 certified hospital.

External links
 Aditya Birla Memorial Hospital
 Aditya Birla Memorial Hospital organizes cancer awareness rally

Hospitals in Pune
Buildings and structures in Pimpri-Chinchwad
Year of establishment missing